James Stott (6 November 1870 – 8 October 1908) was an English professional footballer of the late 19th century.

Career
Primarily a winger, but able to play in a number of positions, he began his career as an amateur with spells at South Bank, Cambuslang and Middlesbrough. In August 1893, Stott signed his first professional contract with Liverpool. He only had one season at Anfield, Liverpool's first in the Football League, but in doing so won the Second Division championship and ended as the club's top scorer with an impressive 14 goals in 17 games. Despite this, though, he was not a first team regular, and in 1894 he moved to Grimsby Town. His spell there was also ended after a year, returning to the north-east to join Newcastle United, where he captained the side to a shock FA Cup victory at Preston North End and promotion from the Second Division in 1898. After one year in the First Division he returned to Middlesbrough, but couldn't get into the first-team, and he retired early in 1900. Described as a snappy dresser, but with a short temper (on and off the pitch), he later worked as a licensee. He contracted a brain tumour, and died in a lunatic asylum in 1908.

Notes

1871 births
1908 deaths
Footballers from Darlington
English footballers
Association football outside forwards
South Bank F.C. players
Middlesbrough F.C. players
Liverpool F.C. players
Grimsby Town F.C. players
Newcastle United F.C. players
English Football League players
Association football midfielders